There are two species of skink named wedgesnout ctenotus:

 Ctenotus brooksi, found in Western Australia, Northern Territory, and South Australia
 Ctenotus euclae, found in South Australia and Western Australia

Reptile common names